Bishop Wilton Wold is the highest point of the Yorkshire Wolds in the East Riding of Yorkshire, England.

As with most of the wolds, it is wide, flat and agricultural in nature. The A166 road passes right by the top. However it is a Marilyn (having topographic prominence of at least ). There is a trig point, two covered reservoirs and an aerial.

The British artist David Hockney painted the view from the summit in 1998.

Halifax bomber crash 1944

Around 10 am on 7 February 1944 a Halifax MkV DK192 (OO-N) from 1663 HCU based at RAF Rufforth crashed on Garrowby Hill.

As well as the 7 aircrew who were on a training flight, a passing lorry driver was also killed.
There is a memorial in a layby on the A166 at Garrowby Hill

David Hockney
Yorkshire-born artist David Hockney produced a painting of Garrowby Hill in 1998.

References

External links
 Hockney's painting Garrowby Hill
 Hockney's East Yorkshire pictures

Marilyns of England
Landforms of the East Riding of Yorkshire
Highest points of English counties
Yorkshire Wolds
Aviation accidents and incidents locations in England